This is a summary of the electoral history of Andrew Little, Leader of the New Zealand Labour Party (2014–2017), President of the New Zealand Labour Party (2009–2011), and a List MP (2011–present).

Parliamentary elections

2011 election

Electorate (as at 26 November 2011): 44,973

2014 election

Leadership elections

2009 presidential election
On 2 March 2009 it was announced that Little was elected unopposed as President of the New Zealand Labour Party.

2014 leadership election

Notes

References

Little, Andrew